Cyphochilus is the scientific name for two genera of organisms and may refer to:

Cyphochilus (beetle), a genus of insects in the family Scarabaeidae
Cyphochilus (plant), a genus of plants in the family Orchidaceae